Serdán may refer to:

Aquiles Serdán (1876–1910), a Maderista Mexican politician and revolutionary from Puebla who took part in the first action of the Mexican Revolution
Aquiles Serdán Municipality, one of the 67 municipalities of Chihuahua in northern Mexico, named for the revolutionary
Estadio de Béisbol Hermanos Serdán, a stadium in Puebla, Mexico
Puebla International Airport, officially Hermanos Serdán International Airport (IATA: PBC, ICAO: MMPB), an international airport near Puebla, Mexico
Huitzilan de Serdán, a town and municipality in Puebla in south-eastern Mexico
Metro Aquiles Serdán, a station in the Line 7 of the metro of Mexico City
Ciudad Serdán, town in Puebla, Mexico

nl:Serdán